The Armagh Senior Hurling Championship is an annual hurling competition contested by top-tier Armagh GAA clubs. Hurling has always been more popular in the north and west of the county. Camlough and Bessbrook are the only south Armagh clubs to have won the Senior Championship.

Middletown Na Fianna are the title holders (2022) defeating Keady Lámh Dhearg in the Final.

Honours
The trophy presented to the winners is the ? The winner qualifies to represent their county in either the Ulster Senior Club Hurling Championship or the Ulster Intermediate Club Hurling Championship, depending on the winner's recent record when competing at provincial level. Following their 2013 success, Cúchulainn's represented Armagh in the Ulster Intermediate Club Hurling Championship, leaving Armagh without representation in the Ulster Senior Club Hurling Championship for that year. Keady became the first Ulster Intermediate Champions from Armagh in 2007 and to date they are the first and only representatives from the county to reach the Ulster Senior Final, doing so in 2010.

List of finals
(r) = replay

References

External links
 Official Armagh Website
 Armagh on Hoganstand
 Armagh Club GAA
 Cúchulainn Hurling Club, Armagh

 
Hurling competitions in County Armagh
Hurling competitions in Northern Ireland
Hurling competitions in Ulster
Senior hurling county championships